Mound Township, Illinois may refer to one of the following townships:

Mound Township, Effingham County, Illinois
Mound Township, McDonough County, Illinois

Not to be confused with:

Big Mound Township, Wayne County, Illinois
Blue Mound Township, McLean County, Illinois
Blue Mound Township, Macon County, Illinois
Brushy Mound Township, Macoupin County, Illinois
Pleasant Mound Township, Bond County, Illinois
Scales Mound Township, Jo Daviess County, Illinois
Western Mound Township, Macoupin County, Illinois

See also

Mound Township (disambiguation)

Illinois township disambiguation pages